Oliver Twist is a 1909 American film and the first film adaptation of Charles Dickens' 1838 novel Oliver Twist. It starred Edith Storey as Oliver Twist, Elita Proctor Otis as Nancy, and William J. Humphrey as Fagin. It was directed by J. Stuart Blackton.

The film was made by Vitagraph Studios and marketed with emphasis on the participation of Elita Proctor Otis, who was said to have made the role of Nancy "famous throughout the world".

Plot summary

Cast
 Edith Storey - Oliver
 William Humphrey - Fagin
 Elita Proctor Otis - Nancy Sykes

References

External links 
 
 
 
 

1909 films
Films based on Oliver Twist
American silent short films
American black-and-white films
Films directed by J. Stuart Blackton
Films about orphans
1909 drama films
1909 short films
Silent American drama films
Films set in London
Films set in the 19th century
1900s English-language films
1900s American films